Maui Taylor (born Maureen Anne Tupaz Fainsan; 28 June 1983) is a Filipino model, singer, and actress.

Career
Taylor entered the entertainment industry with the aid of a cousin who was a member of a dance group in the Philippines. At the age of 14, she was cast in the Filipino TV soap opera Anna Karenina, which led to other roles in various films and television shows.

Her first main role came in the sitcom Kool Ka Lang (1998-2003). She also appeared in Back to Iskul Bukol at the same time. However, it was her controversial performance in the 2001 erotic film Tatarin (inspired by National Artist Nick Joaquin's story, The Summer Solstice) that catapulted her to fame, shedding her previously demure and wholesome image.

Her first starring role in the movie Gamitan grossed almost P70 million in the local box office. She also starred in the film Hibla with Rica Peralejo the same year. In April 2003, she co-starred in the sex comedy Sex Drive with Katya Santos and Wendell Ramos.

Taylor followed up with the movie Ang Huling Birhen sa Lupa, where her performance was well received, earning her a Best Actress nomination, which eventually went to her co-star Ara Mina. Later in 2003, she starred in Masamang Ugat and Bugbog Sarado, as well as a cinematography collection called Sex Goddess.

Taylor was a former member of the Viva Hot Babes, a group of actresses and models created in 2003 by Viva Entertainment founder Vicente Del Rosario, Jr. The original group included fellow actresses Katya Santos, Andrea del Rosario, Kristine Jaca, Sheree, Gwen Garci, Jen Rosendahl, Myles Hernandez, and Hazel Cabrera.

In 2012, Taylor returned to acting in the South Korean film The Taste of Money as the tragic maid of a wealthy conglomerate family.

Personal life
Taylor opted to go low-key after working as an actress for several years in order to focus on her personal life. She and her non-showbiz partner, Anton Sabarre, have two sons, Antoine Miguel and Matteo Alonzo.

She uploads vlogs on YouTube.

Filmography

Film

Television

References

External links

1981 births
Living people
Filipino child actresses
Filipino female models
Filipino radio personalities
Filipino television personalities
GMA Network personalities
ABS-CBN personalities